A Call for American Renewal is an American political manifesto released on May 13, 2021, by 150 members and former members of the Republican Party. It calls for strengthening the rule of law and increasing government ethics. The manifesto was released one day after the ousting of  Representative Liz Cheney as chair of the House Republican Conference, and was largely seen as a reaction against the influence of Trumpism within the Republican Party. The effort was organized by Evan McMullin and Miles Taylor.

Prominent signatories 
The manifesto was initially signed onto by 150 members and former members of the Republican Party.

Former executive branch officials 
Eliot A. Cohen, former Counselor of the United States Department of State
John Mitnick, former General Counsel of the United States Department of Homeland Security
Connie Morella, former United States Ambassador to the Organisation for Economic Co-operation and Development and U.S. Representative for Maryland's 8th congressional district
Elizabeth Neumann, former Homeland Security official
Tom Ridge, 1st United States Secretary of Homeland Security and 43rd Governor of Pennsylvania
Anthony Scaramucci, former White House Communications Director
Miles Taylor, former Chief of staff to the United States Secretary of Homeland Security
Olivia Troye, former homeland security and counter-terrorism advisor to Vice President Pence and aide to the White House Coronavirus Task Force in the Trump administration
Christine Todd Whitman, 9th Administrator of the Environmental Protection Agency and 50th Governor of New Jersey
Dov S. Zakheim, former Comptroller of the Department of Defense
John Negroponte, former United States Deputy Secretary of State, 1st Director of National Intelligence and U.S. Ambassador
Stuart M. Gerson, acting United States Attorney General and former United States Assistant Attorney General for the Civil Division
Mary E. Peters, 15th United States Secretary of Transportation and Administrator of the Federal Highway Administration
Mark Weatherford, 1st deputy under secretary for cybersecurity at the United States Department of Homeland Security
John B. Bellinger III, former Legal Adviser of the Department of State and the National Security Council

Former United States Senators 
David Durenberger, United States Senator from Minnesota

Former members of the United States House of Representatives
Barbara Comstock, U.S. Representative for Virginia's 10th congressional district
Charlie Dent, U.S. Representative for Pennsylvania's 15th congressional district
Charles Djou, U.S. Representative for Hawaii's 1st congressional district
Wayne Gilchrest, U.S. Representative for Maryland's 1st congressional district
Bob Inglis, U.S. Representative for South Carolina's 4th congressional district
Jim Leach, U.S. Representative for Iowa's 2nd congressional district
Paul Mitchell, U.S. Representative for Michigan's 10th congressional district
Reid Ribble, U.S. Representative for Wisconsin's 8th congressional district
Denver Riggleman, U.S. Representative for Virginia's 5th congressional district (Independent)
Claudine Schneider, U.S. Representative for Rhode Island's 2nd congressional district
Joe Walsh, U.S. Representative for Illinois's 8th congressional district (Independent)
Dick Zimmer, U.S. Representative for New Jersey's 12th congressional district
Scott Rigell, U.S. Representative for Virginia's 2nd congressional district
John LeBoutillier, U.S. Representative for New York's 6th congressional district
Rick Lazio, U.S. Representative for New York's 2nd congressional district
Tom Coleman, U.S. Representative for Missouri's 6th congressional district
Tom Petri, U.S. Representative for Wisconsin's 6th congressional district
Steve Bartlett, 56th Mayor of Dallas and U.S. Representative for Texas's 3rd congressional district
Rod Chandler, U.S. Representative for Washington's 8th congressional district
Peter Plympton Smith, U.S. Representative for Vermont's at-large congressional district
Pete McCloskey, U.S. Representative for California's 11th congressional district, California's 17th congressional district then California's 12th congressional district (Democratic)
Mickey Edwards, U.S. Representative for Oklahoma's 5th congressional district (Independent)

Former state officials
Arne Carlson, 37th Governor of Minnesota
Mark Sanford, 115th Governor of South Carolina
Bill Weld, 68th Governor of Massachusetts
Robert F. Orr, Associate Justice of the North Carolina Supreme Court (Independent)

State legislators 
Davy Carter, Speaker of the Arkansas House of Representatives
Bruce Maloch, Arkansas State Senator from the 12th district and Arkansas State Representative from the 4th district
Chad Mayes, Minority Leader of the California State Assembly and member of the California State Assembly from the 42nd district (Independent)
Cole Wist, Colorado State Representative from the 37th district
Bob Worsley, Arizona State Senator from 25th district
Charles Jeter, North Carolina House of Representatives from the 92nd district
Chris Vance, former Chair of the Washington Republican Party, King County Council from the 13th district and Washington State Representative from the 31st district (Independent)
Nate Bell, Arkansas State Representative from the 20th and 22nd district (Independent)
Michelle Udall, Arizona State Representative from the 25th district
Marty Linsky, Massachusetts State Representative from the 13th Norfolk District

Political activists 
Chris Bayley, former King County Prosecuting Attorney
George Conway, co-founder of the Lincoln Project and husband of Kellyanne Conway (Independent)
Evan McMullin, political activist and former CIA operations officer (Independent)
Gabriel Schoenfeld, author, editor, political advisor, commentator and Senior Adviser to Mitt Romney for Presidential campaign
Michael Steele, Chairman of the Republican National Committee, 7th Lieutenant Governor of Maryland and Chairman of the Maryland Republican Party
Bob Yudin, former Chairman of the Bergen County, New Jersey Republican Party
Richard Painter, former chief White House ethics lawyer in the George W. Bush administration (Democratic since 2018)
Neal Simon, business executive and community leader (Independent)
William F. B. O'Reilly, opinion columnist and political consultant
Trevor Potter, former commissioner and chairman of the Federal Election Commission
Tara Setmayer, CNN political Commentator, contributor to ABC News and former Republican communications director (Independent)
Theodore Roosevelt IV, managing director at Barclays Capital Corporation and great-grandson of Theodore Roosevelt
T. Greg Doucette, lawyer
Susan Del Percio, political consultant
Sophia A. Nelson, author and journalist (Independent)
Mona Charen, columnist, journalist and political commentator
Mindy Finn, digital strategist for the Republican Party (Independent)
Max Boot, author
John Kingston III, investor

See also 
 Forward Party (United States)
 Never Trump movement
 Republican Political Alliance for Integrity and Reform

References

External links
Official website

Republican Party (United States) terminology
American political manifestos
Conservative media in the United States
2021 in American politics
2021 documents
Criticism of Donald Trump